Pristimantis lacrimosus is a species of frog in the family Strabomantidae.
It is found in Brazil, Colombia, Ecuador, and Peru.
Its natural habitat is tropical moist lowland forest.

References

lacrimosus
Amphibians of Brazil
Amphibians of Colombia
Amphibians of Ecuador
Amphibians of Peru
Taxa named by Marcos Jiménez de la Espada
Amphibians described in 1875
Taxonomy articles created by Polbot